Ozola minor is a moth of the family Geometridae first described by Frederic Moore in 1888. It is found in Sri Lanka, India, the Andaman Islands, Sumatra, Borneo, the Philippines and Sulawesi.

Its wings are straw coloured. A semicircular dark zone can be seen between the forewing apex and the central angle. Host plants include Gmelina arborea and Premna species.

References

External links
Biology of Ozola minor Moore (Lepidoptera: Geometridae) a defoliator of yemane (Gmelina arborea) 1979

Moths of Asia
Moths described in 1888